Poškus is a Lithuanian language family name. It may refer to:
Robertas Poškus, Lithuanian footballer
Marius Poškus, Lithuanian footballer
Petras Poškus, Lithuanian politician

 
Lithuanian-language surnames